John Cross (fl. 1402) of Guildford, Surrey, was an English politician. He was a Member (MP) of the Parliament of England for Guildford in 1402.

References

14th-century births
15th-century deaths
English MPs 1402
People from Guildford